The 2015 Melbourne Storm season is the 18th in the club's history. They competed in the 2015 NRL season and were coached by Craig Bellamy, who was coach for the 13th consecutive season and captained by Cameron Smith, sole captain for the 8th consecutive season. He played his 300th NRL Game in Round 19 becoming only the 24th player in history to do so.

With the youngest Storm side ever assembled under Craig Bellamy, the team once again managed a 14–10 record for the second straight season. This time it was enough to see Melbourne clinch a top four spot on the final day of the season. In Week One of the finals they took on Minor Premiers the Sydney Roosters, who went into the clash on the back of a 12-game winning streak. Storm managed to pull off a two-point upset win but were unable to reach the Grand Final, going down to the Cowboys at home two weeks later. Storm's defence was a vital part of the team's success in 2015. The men in purple managed to keep their opponents to single digit scores on six occasions throughout the season, five of which were against sides that finished inside the top eight. A highlight of the season was the emergence of youngster Cameron Munster. Following Billy Slater's season-ending shoulder surgery in Round 10, 21-year-old Munster produced a string of outstanding performances at fullback for the Storm that provided Storm fans with an exciting look to the future. Cameron Smith and Craig Bellamy became the first player and coach to reach the illustrious 300 game milestone for the club. After two years at the helm, Mark Evans handed over the position of CEO to 32-year-old Dave Donaghy.

Season summary 
 Auckland Nines - The club competed in the second annual Auckland Nines competition over 31 January-1 February. The Storm lost two of their three pool games thus not progressing to the final stage. Will Chambers captained the squad, with the team wearing sleeveless jerseys.
 February 7 - The Storm play Canberra in a preseason trial and go down 32–20 in very hot conditions.
 February 13 - Will Chambers and Jesse Bromwich represent Melbourne in the Annual All Star game.
 February 21 - The Storm complete their trial match period with a come from behind 32–30 win over Canterbury Bulldogs. The Storm added 24 points in the second half.
 Round 1 - The Storm commence the 2015 Season with a win over St George Illawarra. Dale Finucane, Felise Kaufusi and Blake Green all make their playing debuts for the Storm. Ryan Hinchcliffe plays his 150th Game.
 Round 2 - Tom Learoyd-Lahrs makes his playing debut for the Storm.
 Round 4 - The Storm suffer their second loss of the season, during Golden Point extra time. The Storm lost the game after the Cowboys leveled the scores after being 17-10 down with 5 minutes remaining in normal time.
 Round 8 - Nelson Asofa-Solomona makes his playing debut after being elevated from the NYC team.
 1 May - Representative weekend - 15 Storm Players are chosen to represent the various teams over representative weekend 
 Round 9 - Christian Welch makes his playing debut after being elevated from the NYC team. Billy Slater scores two tries on his return game following a shoulder injury. The tries take Slater's career total to 172, surpassing Ken Irvine's Australian record for most tries with a single first grade club. Melbourne equal their biggest win of the season thus far defeating the Eels by 18 points.
 Round 12 - The Storm suffer their worst loss of the season thus far losing to the Roosters by 22 points. The storm failed to score a try in the match.
 Round 13 - The Storm bounced back from the Round 12 loss with their biggest win of the season so far with a 20 nil win over the Panthers. Richard Kennar also makes his playing debut.
 Round 14 - The storm suffer a narrow loss against the Eels playing without their State of Origin representatives. Hymel Hunt plays his first game for the Storm since transferring from the Titans.
 Round 18 - The Storm suffer their fourth consecutive loss in a 28–14 loss to the Warriors.
 Round 19 - Cameron Smith joined an elite group in NRL circles as he lined up for his 300th Melbourne Storm and NRL Game becoming only the 24th player to achieve this. The game was also notable as it became the Storms biggest win for the season thus far (42 points) and also scored their highest total (52 points) thus far scoring 10 tries.
 Round 20 - The Storm will stage a home game in ay McLean Park in Napier New Zealand. Storm player Tohu Harris has designed the jersey for the game which takes in his New Zealand, Polynesian and Maori Heritage 
 Round 21 - Cameron Smith sets another record as he captained Melbourne Storm for the 200th time against Wests Tigers. Mahe Fonua also played his 50th game.
 Round 22 - Cameron Munster scores a Hat-trick of tries as the Storm beat Gold Coast by 22 points
 Round 23 - Kevin Proctor plays his 150th NRL Game in the Storm's big win over Cronulla Sharks.
 Rounds 25 and 26 - The Storm complete the regular season with two hard fought wins over Cowboys and Broncos. Both teams also finished the season in the Top 4. The two wins mean the Storm finished the season in the Top 4.
 Finals Week 1 - The Storm defeat the 1st placed Sydney Roosters in an upset  20–18 to secure a week off and a Home Preliminary Final in Week 3.
 Finals Week 3 - The Storm suffer defeat in their home Preliminary Final against the North Queensland Cowboys ending their 2015 season one game short of the Grand Final. The game was also notable as the attendance of 29,315 spectators was officially the highest attendance so far at AAMI Park for a Storm game.

Milestone games

Fixtures

Preseason  

Source:

Regular season

Source:
 FG - Field Goal
 GP - Golden Point extra time

Finals

Ladder

2015 Coaches
 Craig Bellamy -Head Coach
 Justin Morgan - Assistant Coach
 Anthony Seibold - Assistant Coach
 Nathan Brown -Coaching Consultant
 Tony Ayoub -Head Physiotherapist

2015 Squad
As of 20 June 2015

Player movements

Source NRL.com:

Losses

Mitch Garbutt to Brisbane Broncos
Rhys Kennedy to Canberra Raiders
Ryan Hoffman to New Zealand Warriors
Matthew Lodge to Wests Tigers
Junior Moors to Castleford Tigers
Bryan Norrie to Retirement
Justin O'Neill to North Queensland Cowboys
Ben Roberts to Castleford Tigers
George Rose to St George Illawarra Dragons
Cody Walker to South Sydney Rabbitohs
Sisa Waqa to Canberra Raiders

Gains

Dale Finucane from Canterbury Bulldogs
Blake Green from Wigan Warriors
Tom Learoyd-Lahrs from Canberra Raiders
Shaun Nona from Northern Pride

Representative honours
The following players played representative matches in 2015. (C) = Captain

Statistics 
Statistics Source: Current as of the end of the 2015 NRL season.

Most Points in a Game: 16 
 Cameron Smith (1 Try, 6 Goals) vs Cronulla Sharks (Round 3)

Most tries in a Game: 3 
 Cameron Munster vs Gold Coast Titans (Round 22)

Highest score in a winning game: 52 points
 vs Penrith Panthers (Round 19)

Lowest score in a winning game: 12 points
 vs St George Illawarra Dragons (Round 1)

Greatest winning margin: 42 points
 vs Penrith Panthers (Round 19)

Highest score in a losing game: 22 points
 vs Manly Sea Eagles (Round 2)
 vs Parramatta Eels (Round 14)

Lowest score in a losing game: 2 points
 vs Sydney Roosters (Round 12)

Greatest losing margin: 22 points
 vs Sydney Roosters (Round 12)

Greatest number of Games won consecutively: 3
 Between Rounds 5 and 7

Greatest number of Games lost consecutively: 4
 Between Rounds 14 and 18

Jersey
In 2015 the Storm jerseys were manufactured by BLK and new jerseys were designed for 2015. The home Jersey was predominantly navy blue with Purple across the shoulders and a Silver strip running horizontally across the chest. The Away Jersey Features a White design with purple hoops down the jersey. The Storm also broke new ground for Rugby League featuring an AFL style sleeveless jersey for the Auckland Nines.

Awards

Melbourne Storm Awards Night
Held at Docklands, Melbourne on Wednesday 7 October 2015.
 Melbourne Storm Player of the Year: Jesse Bromwich
 Melbourne Storm Rookie of the Year: Cameron Munster
 Suzuki Members' Player of the Year: Cooper Cronk & Jesse Bromwich
 Melbourne Storm Most Improved: Tim Glasby
 Melbourne Storm Best Forward: Cameron Smith
 Melbourne Storm Best Back:Cameron Munster
 Best Try: Marika Koroibete, Round 19 vs Panthers
 Feeder Club Player of the Year Award: 
 Darren Bell U20s Player of the Year Award: Latrell Robinson
 U20s Best Forward: Joe Stimson
 U20s Best Back: Jake Turpin
 Greg Brentnall Young Achievers Award: Aaron Teroi
 Mick Moore Club Person of the Year: Dan Di Pasqua
 Chairman's Award: Danielle Smith (Chief Financial Officer)
 Life Member Inductees: Ryan Hinchcliffe & Julie Cliff

RLPA Awards Night
 RLPA Rookie of the Year: Cameron Munster
 RLPA Wellbeing and Education Club of the Year: Brian Phelan, Andrew Blowers & Peter Robinson

Additional Awards
 I Don't Quit Iron Bar: Dale Finucane
 QRL Ron McAuliffe Medal: Cameron Smith

Notes

References

Melbourne Storm seasons
Melbourne Storm season